George Dallas may refer to: 

 George M. Dallas (1792–1864), U.S. Senator from Pennsylvania and 11th Vice President of the United States
 George M. Dallas (judge) (1839–1917), American lawyer and judge of the U.S. Court of Appeals for the Third Circuit
 Sir George Dallas, 1st Baronet (1758–1833), British Member of Parliament for Newport 1800–1802
 George Dallas (Labour politician) (1878–1961), British Member of Parliament for Wellingborough 1929–1931
 George Dallas (cricketer) (1827–1888), British army officer and cricketer

See also
 George Dallas Sherman, musician
Dallas (surname)